The Fox Hills Formation is a Cretaceous geologic formation in the northwestern Great Plains of North America.  It is present from Alberta on the north to Colorado in the south.

Fossil remains of dinosaurs, including tyrannosaurs, as well as large marine reptiles, such as mosasaurs, have been recovered from the formation.

Lithology
The Fox Hills Formation consists of marginal marine yellow to grey sandstone with shale interbeds.  It was deposited as a regressive sequence of barrier islands during the retreat of the Western Interior Seaway in Late Cretaceous time.  In its eastern extents, the formation is underlain by the marine Pierre Shale in the United States and by the equivalent Bearpaw Formation in Canada, while in western ranges in Montana and Wyoming it overlies the Lewis Shale. The Fox Hills is overlain by continental sediments of the Laramie Formation in Colorado and the Lance Formation in Wyoming, the later being the equivalent of the overlying Hell Creek Formation in Montana.

See also

 List of dinosaur-bearing rock formations
 List of stratigraphic units with indeterminate dinosaur fossils

References

Aquifers in the United States
Maastrichtian Stage of North America
Cretaceous geology of Wyoming
Cretaceous Montana
Great Plains
Cretaceous Colorado
Cretaceous Alberta
Cretaceous geology of North Dakota
Cretaceous geology of South Dakota